Paulo António da Silva Ribeiro (born 6 March 1984) is a Portuguese former professional footballer who played as a goalkeeper.

Club career
Ribeiro was born in Setúbal. After emerging through local Vitória FC's youth academy and making his Primeira Liga debut on 31 January 2005 in a 1–1 away draw against Sporting CP, he joined FC Porto in the summer of 2005. During his two season-spell he could never manage to be more than third choice, only appearing in preseason; he also spent two years on loan in the Segunda Liga.

In 2009, Ribeiro was released by Porto and joined lowly F.C. Vizela. At the end of the campaign he signed with Leixões SC, recently relegated to the second tier, only managing to play twice in the league in his sole season (four competitive matches) and being released by the Matosinhos club.

Honours
Vitória Setúbal
Taça de Portugal: 2004–05

Porto
Taça de Portugal: 2005–06

References

External links

1984 births
Living people
Sportspeople from Setúbal
Portuguese footballers
Association football goalkeepers
Primeira Liga players
Liga Portugal 2 players
Segunda Divisão players
Vitória F.C. players
FC Porto B players
FC Porto players
S.C. Olhanense players
Portimonense S.C. players
F.C. Vizela players
Leixões S.C. players
G.D. Chaves players
AD Oliveirense players
C.D. Pinhalnovense players
Portugal youth international footballers
Portugal under-21 international footballers
Portugal B international footballers